The following is a list of programs broadcast on Sundance TV and Sundance Now.

Original programming

Drama

Comedy

Unscripted

Docuseries

Reality

Variety

Co-productions

Upcoming original programming

Co-productions

Acquired programming

Current
 The Andy Griffith Show
 Criminal Minds
 Columbo
 Gilligan's Island
 Law & Order
 Law & Order: Criminal Intent
 Monk
 NCIS
 Perry Mason

Former
 All in the Family
 Back
 Barney Miller
 Blue Planet II
 The Bob Newhart Show
 Breaking Bad
 Dynasties
 Gomer Pyle, U.S.M.C.
 Gomorrah
 The Great Christmas Light Fight
 Hogan's Heroes
 JAG
 Kath & Kim
 Mama's Family
 The Mary Tyler Moore Show
 M*A*S*H*
 My So-Called Life
 Orphan Black
 The Returned
 Roots 
 Saved by the Bell
 Seven Worlds, One Planet
 Transparent

Notes

References

External links

Sundance TV